Nymphaeaceae is a family of flowering plants, commonly called water lilies. They live as rhizomatous aquatic herbs in temperate and tropical climates around the world. The family contains nine genera with about 70 known species. Water lilies are rooted in soil in bodies of water, with leaves and flowers floating on or emergent from the surface.  Leaves are round, with a radial notch in  Nymphaea and Nuphar, but fully circular in Victoria and Euryale.

Water lilies are a well-studied clade of plants because their large flowers with multiple unspecialized parts were initially considered to represent the floral pattern of the earliest flowering plants, and later genetic studies confirmed their evolutionary position as basal angiosperms. Analyses of floral morphology and molecular characteristics and comparisons with a sister taxon, the family Cabombaceae, indicate, however, that the flowers of extant water lilies with the most floral parts are more derived than the genera with fewer floral parts. Genera with more floral parts, Nuphar, Nymphaea, Victoria, have a beetle pollination syndrome, while genera with fewer parts are pollinated by flies or bees, or are self- or wind-pollinated. Thus, the large number of relatively unspecialized floral organs in the Nymphaeaceae is not an ancestral condition for the clade.

Description
The Nymphaeaceae are aquatic, rhizomatous herbs. The family is further characterized by scattered vascular bundles in the stems, and frequent presence of latex, usually with distinct, stellate-branched sclereids projecting into the air canals. Hairs are simple, usually producing mucilage (slime).

Leaves are alternate and spiral, opposite or occasionally whorled, simple, peltate or nearly so, entire to toothed or dissected, short to long petiolate, with blade submerged, floating or emergent, with palmate to pinnate venation. Stipules are either present or absent. Surface leaves are absent during winter, and therefore the gases in the rhizome lacunae access equilibrium with the gases of the sediment water. The leftover of internal pressure is embodied by the constant streams of bubbles that outbreak when rising leaves are ruptured in the spring.

Flowers 
Flowers are solitary, bisexual, radial, with a long pedicel and usually floating or raised above the surface of the water, with girdling vascular bundles in receptacle. Some species are protogynous and primarily cross-pollinated, but because male and female stages overlap during the second day of flowering, and because it is self-compatible, self-fertilization is possible. Female and male parts of the flower are usually active at different times, to facilitate cross-pollination, although this is just one of several reproductive strategies used by these plants.

There are 4–12 sepals, which are distinct to connate, imbricate, and often petallike. Petals lacking or 8 to numerous, inconspicuous to showy, often intergrading with stamens. Stamens are 3 to numerous, the innermost sometimes represented by staminodes. Filaments are distinct, free or adnate to petaloid staminodes, slender and well differentiated from anthers to laminar and poorly differentiated from anthers; pollen grains usually monosulcate or lacking apertures. Carpels are 3 to numerous, distinct or connate.

Fruit 
The fruit is an aggregate of nuts, a berry, or an irregularly dehiscent fleshy spongy capsule. Seeds are often arillate, more or less lacking endosperm.

Taxonomy

Nymphaeaceae has been investigated systematically for decades because botanists considered their floral morphology to represent one of the earliest groups of angiosperms. Modern genetic analyses by the Angiosperm Phylogeny Group researchers has confirmed its basal position among flowering plants. In addition, the Nymphaeaceae are more genetically diverse and geographically dispersed than other basal angiosperms. Nymphaeaceae is placed in the order Nymphaeales, which is the second diverging group of angiosperms after Amborella in the most widely accepted flowering plant classification system, APG IV system.

Nymphaeaceae is a small family of three to six genera: Barclaya, Euryale, Nuphar, Nymphaea, Ondinea, and Victoria. The genus Barclaya is sometimes given rank as its own family, Barclayaceae, on the basis of an extended perianth tube (combined sepals and petals) arising from the top of the ovary and by stamens that are joined in the base. However, molecular phylogenetic work includes it in Nymphaeaceae. The genus Ondinea has recently been shown to be a morphologically aberrant species of Nymphaea, and is now included in this genus. The genera Euryale, of far east Asia, and Victoria, from South America, are closely related despite their geographic distance, but their relationship toward Nymphaea need further studies.

The sacred lotus was once thought to be a water lily, but is now recognized to be a highly modified eudicot in its own family Nelumbonaceae of the order Proteales.

Fossils 
Several fossil species are known, including Cretaceous representatives of Nymphaea, as well as fossil genera such as Jaguariba from the Cretaceous of Brazil and Notonuphar from the Eocene of Antarctica.

As an invasive species
The beautiful nature of water lilies has led to their widespread use as ornamental plants. The Mexican waterlily, native to the Gulf Coast of North America, is planted throughout the continent. It has escaped from cultivation and become invasive in some areas, such as California's San Joaquin Valley. It can infest slow-moving bodies of water and is difficult to eradicate. Populations can be controlled by cutting top growth. Herbicides can also be used to control populations using glyphosate and fluridone.

Culture

The water lily is the national flower of Iran, Bangladesh and Sri Lanka. The Emblem of Bangladesh contains a lily floating on water. It is also the birth flower for the month of July.

The Nymphaeaceae, which is also called (Nilufar Abi in Persian), can be seen in many reliefs of the Achaemenid period (552 BC) such as the statue of Anahita in the Persepolis. Lotus flower was included in Kaveh the blacksmith's Derafsh and later as the flag of the Sasanian Empire Derafsh Kaviani. Today, it is known as the symbol of Iranians Solar Hijri Calendar.

Lily pads, also known as Seeblätter, are a charge in Northern European heraldry, often coloured red (gules), and appear on the flag of Friesland and the coat of arms of Denmark (in the latter case often replaced by red hearts).

The water lily has a special place in Sangam literature and Tamil poetics, where it is considered symbolic of the grief of separation; it is considered to evoke imagery of the sunset, the seashore, and the shark.

Heraldry

In visual arts 
Water lilies were depicted by the French artist Claude Monet (1840–1926) in a series of paintings.

Gallery

See also
 Nelumbo
 Pamplemousses Botanical Garden, famous for its giant water lilies
 List of plants known as lily

References

Further reading
 The genera of the Nymphaeaceae and Ceratophyllaceae in the southeastern United States. J. Arnold Arbor. 40: 94-112.
 Perry D. Slocum: Waterlilies and Lotuses. Timber Press 2005,  (restricted online version at Google Books)
 Thomas Borsch, Cornelia Löhne, Mame Samba Mbaye, and John H. Wiersema. 2011. Towards a complete species tree of Nymphaea: shedding further light on subg. Brachyceras and its relationships to the Australian water-lilies. Telopea 13(1-2): 193-217.

External links

 Nymphaeaceae of Mongolia in FloraGREIF

 
Angiosperm families
Aquatic plants
Extant Early Cretaceous first appearances